St. David Catholic Secondary School, established in 1965, is a Roman Catholic high school instructing students from grades 9 to 12. St. David CSS is located in Waterloo, Ontario and is a member of the Waterloo Catholic District School Board. Its building is the oldest secondary school building in the board.  Historically it was a junior high school, instructing students from grades 7 to 10. St. David received full funding from the Ontario Ministry of Education in 1985, when the school changed its educational focus to students in grades 9 to OAC. Since the OAC year of secondary school was phased out of Ontario schools in the 2002-2003 school year, St. David CSS now teaches grades 9 through to 12. At present (2011) St. David educates 1045 students. St. David is named after St David, a 6th-century saint.

Staff and administration 
The school's principal is David Jaeger.

The school  has approximately 84 full-time teaching staff.

Uniform policy 
As with the other secondary schools in the Waterloo Catholic District School Board, St. David requires all students to wear a uniform every day, except for the occasional dress-down day (known to staff and students as "Civies Day").

Notable alumni
Luca Congi, kicker/punter for the Saskatchewan Roughriders.  Congi was a member of St. David's senior football team in 2000 and 2001, in which years the team won the Waterloo County high school senior football championships, the first senior football championships in the school's history.
John Sullivan, safety for the Winnipeg Blue Bombers.
Michael Latta, National Hockey League player.

See also 
List of Waterloo Region, Ontario schools
List of high schools in Ontario

References

External links 
 St. David Catholic Secondary School official site
 St. David school tour
 Waterloo Catholic District School Board

Waterloo Catholic District School Board
Catholic secondary schools in Ontario
Educational institutions established in 1965
Schools in Waterloo, Ontario
High schools in the Regional Municipality of Waterloo
1965 establishments in Ontario